Rajeev Ram and Bobby Reynolds were the defending champions, but Ram chose not to compete in doubles.Reynolds chose to play with Robert Kendrick, but they lost against Treat Conrad Huey and Harsh Mankad in the first round.Stephen Huss and Joseph Sirianni won in the final 1–6, 6–2, [13–11] against Chris Guccione and Frank Moser.

Seeds

Draw

Draw

References
 Doubles Draw
 Doubles Qualifying Draw

Baton Rouge Pro Tennis Classic - Doubles
Baton Rouge Pro Tennis Classic